Jane Kasumba is a Ugandan media personality, a broadcaster, a lawyer, a communications expert and a professional sportscaster who has worked for over 12 years in public and broadcast media. She most recently served as the UBC TV Manager Uganda Broadcasting Corporation (UBC).

Education and background 
Jane Kasumba has studied in both Africa and Europe. She was also raised on both continents. Jane Kasumba has a bachelor's degree in Political Science, a Bachelor of Laws Degree and a Post Graduate Diploma in Law. Jane also has numerous qualifications in television production from both China and France. Jane is the proud recipient of 3 FICTS Awards and 3 RTV Awards amongst other accolades. In 2016 she was awarded by the Uganda Media Women's Association for her reportage of the Ugandan General Elections.

Career 

Jane Kasumba commenced her TV broadcast career at TV Africa as a continuity announcer. She would later take on the public relations docket at the national broadcaster in Uganda. She rose through the ranks becoming the Head of that Television Network. Jane has been behind the broadcast of major national and international broadcasts around the world. Jane also developed and was trained in the skills of Sports Broadcasting and TV Talkshow Presentation. She is an expert Master of Ceremonies and an expert Conference Moderator.

References

External links
 Company Website

Year of birth missing (living people)
Living people
Ugandan women journalists
Ugandan journalists
Ugandan women television journalists